Peter Wilson may refer to:

 Peter Winston (politician) (1836–1920), American physician and Democratic politician
 Peter Winston (chess player) (born 1958), American chess player who disappeared in the 1970s